David Francis Russell (born 29 October 1936) is an English former first-class cricketer.

Russell was born at Hackney in October 1936. He later studied at St Peter's Hall at the University of Oxford. While studying at Oxford, Russell made five appearances in first-class cricket for Oxford University in 1959, a tally which included a match against the touring Indians. He scored 57 runs in his five matches with a high score of 22, while with his off break bowling he took 11 wickets at an average of 31.27 and best figures of 3 for 53.

References

External links

1936 births
Living people
People from Hackney, London
Alumni of St Peter's College, Oxford
English cricketers
Oxford University cricketers